Kyrgyzstan competed at the 2020 Summer Olympics in Tokyo. Originally scheduled to take place from 24 July to 9 August 2020, the Games were postponed to 23 July to 8 August 2021, because of the COVID-19 pandemic. It was the nation's seventh consecutive appearance at the Summer Olympics in the post-Soviet era.

Medalists

Competitors
The following is the list of number of competitors in the Games.

Athletics

Kyrgyz athletes achieved the entry standards, either by qualifying time or by world ranking, in the following track and field events (with a maximum of three athletes in each event):

Track & road events

Fencing

Kyrgyzstan entered one fencer into the Olympic competition for the first time since 2008. Roman Petrov claimed a spot in the men's épée by winning the final match at the Asia and Oceania Zonal Qualifier in Tashkent, Uzbekistan.

Judo
 
Kyrgyzstan entered one male judoka into the Olympic tournament based on the International Judo Federation Olympics Individual Ranking.

Shooting

Swimming 
 
Kyrgyz swimmers further achieved qualifying standards in the following events (up to a maximum of 2 swimmers in each event at the Olympic Qualifying Time (OQT), and potentially 1 at the Olympic Selection Time (OST)):

Weightlifting

Kyrgyzstan entered one male weightlifter into the Olympic competition. Bekdoolot Rasulbekov topped the list of weightlifters from Asia in the men's 96 kg category based on the IWF Absolute Continental Rankings.

Wrestling

Kyrgyzstan qualified nine wrestlers for each of the following classes into the Olympic competition. Two of them finished among the top six to book Olympic spots in the men's Greco-Roman 87 kg and women's freestyle 62 kg at the 2019 World Championships, while seven additional licenses were awarded to the Kyrgyz wrestlers, who progressed to the top two finals of their respective weight categories at the 2021 Asian Qualification Tournament in Almaty, Kazakhstan.

Freestyle

Greco-Roman

References

Nations at the 2020 Summer Olympics
2020
2021 in Kyrgyzstani sport